The 2017 Blancpain GT Sports Club was the third season of the SRO Group's Blancpain GT Sports Club, an auto racing series for grand tourer cars. The Blancpain GT Sports Club is a championship for Bronze and Iron drivers only. The "Iron" categorisation is within the Bronze category, for drivers over the age of 60. All drivers must participate with GT3-spec cars, RACB G3 cars or GTE-spec cars.

Calendar
At the annual press conference during the 2016 24 Hours of Spa on 29 July, the Stéphane Ratel Organisation announced the first draft of the 2017 calendar. The series started at Misano on 2 April and ended in Barcelona on 1 October. The round at Brands Hatch was replaced by a round in Silverstone. On 7 November, the SRO announced the calendar was finalised, confirming the series would go the Hungaroring to support the Blancpain GT Series Sprint Cup.

Entry list

Race results

Championship standings
Scoring system
Championship points were awarded for the first six positions in each Qualifying Race and for the first ten positions in each Main Race. Entries were required to complete 75% of the winning car's race distance in order to be classified and earn points.

Qualifying Race points

Main Race points

Drivers' championships

Overall

Iron Cup

See also
2017 Blancpain GT Series

References

External links

Blancpain GT Sports Club
Blancpain GT Sports Club